Tyrell Ford (born March 30, 1998) is a professional gridiron football cornerback for the Green Bay Packers of the National Football League (NFL). He played college football at Waterloo.

High school career
Playing alongside his twin brother, Tre Ford, at A. N. Myer Secondary School, Ford led the Marauders to a Junior Metrobowl championship in 2013, and three straight OFSAA championships from 2014 to 2016.

University career
Ford played U Sports football for the Waterloo Warriors from 2017 to 2021. Over four seasons, he played in 30 games where he had 94 total tackles, six sacks, 20 pass knockdowns, and six interceptions, including one returned for a touchdown. He was also a kick returner for the team where he had 40 kick returns for 733 yards and 82 punt returns for 1,139 yards and three touchdowns. He was named a U Sports Second Team All-Canadian at cornerback in 2019 and 2021.

Professional career

Winnipeg Blue Bombers
Ford was drafted in the second round, 13th overall, by the Winnipeg Blue Bombers in the 2022 CFL Draft and signed with the team on May 20, 2022. He made the team's active roster following training camp and played in his first professional game on June 10, 2022, against the Ottawa Redblacks where he had one special teams tackle. In his rookie season he played in all 18 regular season games and contributed with 10 special teams tackles and three defensive tackles. Following the season, he had a workout with the Jacksonville Jaguars (NFL). He was released by the Blue Bombers on January 10, 2023, in order to sign an NFL contract.

Green Bay Packers
On January 10, 2023, Ford was signed to a reserve/future contract with the Green Bay Packers.

Personal life
Ford has a twin brother, Tre, who plays quarterback for the Edmonton Elks and also played for the Waterloo Warriors. Ford began playing football when he was six years old when his father, Robert, introduced him to the sport and also served as his coach.

References

External links
 Green Bay Packers bio

1998 births
Living people
Canadian football defensive backs
Green Bay Packers players
Players of Canadian football from Ontario
Sportspeople from Niagara Falls, Ontario
Waterloo Warriors football players
Winnipeg Blue Bombers players